Fatma Omar (born 17 November 1973) is an Egyptian powerlifter competing in the -56 kg category. She is a dominant power in her sport, winning gold in her event in four Summer Paralympics, and another four gold medals at the IPC Powerlifting World Championships.

Personal history
Omar was born in Cairo, Egypt in 1973. At the age of one she was contracted polio, which resulted in spinal damage. She has two daughters.

Powerlifting career
Omar first represented her country at the 1998 IPC Powerlifting World Championships, held in Dubai. She entered one of the lowest weight categories, the 44 kg, winning the gold medal. Following this success she was selected to compete at the 2000 Summer Paralympics in Sydney, Australia. At the Sydney Games she competed in the 44 kg weight class taking the gold medal with a lift of 109 kg, beating Lucy Ogechukwu Ejike of Nigeria. Four years later at the Athens Games, Omar moved up to the 56 kg class. She outclassed the field with a lift of 127.5 kg.

At the 2008 Beijing Games, Omar again competed at the 56 kg level. She broke the world record with a winning lift of 141.5 kg.

After her win in Beijing, Nigeria's Lucy Ejike stated that she would move up to Omar's weight division to challenge for the 56 kg weight class. This led to a showdown at the 2012 Summer Paralympics in London with her rival from Athens. Ejike took the lead in the first round with a lift of 135 kg but she was unable to better this attempt, while Omar improved her record from Beijing with a final lift of 142 kg taking her fourth gold medal.

Four years later Ejike and Omar met for the third time at a Paralympic Games, when thy both entered the 2016 Games in Rio. After London the International Paralympic Committee changed the powerlifting weight categories for both men and women, and the two competed in the women's 61 kg division. The year previous Mexico's Amalia Perez had set a world record in the 61 kg with a lift of 133 kg, which Ejike surpassed with her first lift of 135 kg. Omar had failed at 133 kg on her first lift, but was successful at the same weight on her second attempt. Ejike improved her lead with her second lift, setting her second world record of the day with a weight of 138 kg. Omar responded with a final lift of 140 kg, putting Ejike into silver medal place. Unfortunately for Omar, Ejike lifted 142 kg to leave Omar with the silver medal for the first time  in her Paralympic career.

She won the bronze medal in her event at the 2021 World Para Powerlifting Championships held in Tbilisi, Georgia.

References

External links
 

1973 births
Living people
Egyptian powerlifters
Female powerlifters
Paralympic powerlifters of Egypt
Paralympic gold medalists for Egypt
Paralympic silver medalists for Egypt
Paralympic medalists in powerlifting
Powerlifters at the 2000 Summer Paralympics
Powerlifters at the 2004 Summer Paralympics
Powerlifters at the 2008 Summer Paralympics
Powerlifters at the 2012 Summer Paralympics
Powerlifters at the 2016 Summer Paralympics
Powerlifters at the 2020 Summer Paralympics
Medalists at the 2000 Summer Paralympics
Medalists at the 2004 Summer Paralympics
Medalists at the 2008 Summer Paralympics
Medalists at the 2012 Summer Paralympics
Medalists at the 2016 Summer Paralympics
African Games silver medalists for Egypt
African Games medalists in weightlifting
Competitors at the 2015 African Games
Sportspeople from Cairo
20th-century Egyptian women
21st-century Egyptian women